William Mayhew may refer to:
 William Mayhew (politician) (1787–1855), British politician
 William Mayhew (doctor) (1821–1905), doctor in Toodyay, Western Australia
 William Mayhew (died 1559), English politician, Great Yarmouth borough, 1554
 William Mayhew (librarian), librarian of the Harvard Library